The Marinoan glaciation, sometimes also known as the Varanger glaciation, was a period of worldwide glaciation that lasted from approximately 650 to 632.3 ± 5.9 Ma (million years ago) during the Cryogenian period. This glaciation possibly covered the entire planet, in an event called the Snowball Earth. The end of the glaciation was caused by volcanic release of carbon dioxide and dissolution of gas hydrates and might have been hastened by the release of methane from equatorial permafrost.

Origin of name and history of terminology 
The name is derived from the stratigraphic terminology of the Adelaide Geosyncline (Adelaide Rift Complex) in South Australia and is taken from the Adelaide suburb of Marino. The term Marinoan Series was first used in a 1950 paper by Douglas Mawson and Reg Sprigg to subdivide the Neoproterozoic rocks of the Adelaide area and encompassed all strata from the top of the Brighton Limestone to the base of the Cambrian. The corresponding time period, referred to as the Marinoan Epoch, spanned from the middle Cryogenian to the top of the Ediacaran in modern terminology. Mawson recognised a glacial episode within the Marinoan Epoch which he referred to as the Elatina glaciation after the 'Elatina Tillite' (now Elatina Formation) where he found the evidence. However, the term Marinoan glaciation came into common usage because it was the glaciation that occurred during the Marinoan Epoch, as distinct from the earlier glaciation during the Sturtian Epoch (the time period of deposition of the older Sturtian Series).

The term Marinoan glaciation was later applied globally to any glaciogenic formations assumed (directly or indirectly) to correlate with Mawson's original Elatina glaciation in South Australia. Recently, there has been a move to return to the term Elatina glaciation in South Australia because of uncertainties regarding global correlation and because an Ediacaran glacial episode (Gaskiers) also occurs within the wide-ranging Marinoan Epoch.

Cryogenian Snowball Earth 

Emerging evidence suggests that the Earth underwent a number of glaciations during the Neoproterozoic era. There were three (or possibly four) significant ice ages during the late Neoproterozoic. Of these glaciations, the Sturtian glaciation was the most significant, whereas the Marinoan was a shorter, but still worldwide glaciation. Other Cryogenian glaciations were probably small and not global as compared to the Marinoan or Sturtian glaciations.

During the Marinoan glaciation, characteristic glacial deposits indicate that Earth suffered one of the most severe ice ages in its history. Glaciers extended and contracted in a series of rhythmic pulses, possibly reaching as far as the equator.

The melting of the Snowball Earth is associated with greenhouse warming due to the accumulation of high levels of carbon dioxide in the atmosphere.

Evidence 

Even though much evidence has been lost through geological changes, field investigations show evidence of the Marinoan glaciation in China, Svalbard archipelago and South Australia.  In Guizhou Province, China, glacial rocks were found to be underlying and overlying a layer of volcanic ashes which contained zircon minerals, which could be dated through radioisotopes. Glacial deposits in South Australia are approximately the same age (about 630 Ma), confirmed by similar stable carbon isotopes, mineral deposits (including sedimentary barite), and other unusual sedimentary structures. Two diamictite-rich layers in the top  of the  Neoproterozoic strata of the northeastern Svalbard archipelago represent the first and final phases of the Marinoan glaciation.

According to Eyles and Young, the Marinoan is a second episode of Neoproterozoic glaciation (680–690 Ma) occurring in the Adelaide Geosyncline. According to them, "It is separated from the Sturtian by a thick succession of sedimentary rocks containing no evidence of glaciation. This glacial phase could correspond to the recently described Ice Brooke formation in the northern Cordillera."

See also 
 Sturtian glaciation
 Adelaide Rift Complex
 Huronian glaciation

References 

Ice ages
Cryogenian
Glaciology
Extinction events